The 2019 European Youth Weightlifting Championships took place at the Leonardo Club Hotel in Eilat, Israel from 7 to 14 December 2019.

Medal overview

Under-15

Boys

Girls

Youth (Under-17)

Boys

Girls

Medal table
Ranking by Big (Total result) medals

Ranking by all medals: Big (Total result) and Small (Snatch and Clean & Jerk)

References

External links
Results 

Youth,European Championships,2019
European Youth Championships
European Championships
2019 in Israeli sport
Youth,European Championships,2019
Sport in Eilat
December 2019 sports events in Europe